Frank Popper (17 April 1918 – 12 July 2020) was a Czech-born French-British historian of art and technology and Professor Emeritus of Aesthetics and the Science of Art at the University of Paris VIII. He was decorated with the medal of the Légion d'honneur by the French Government. He is author of the books Origins and Development of Kinetic Art, Art, Action, and Participation, Art of the Electronic Age and From Technological to Virtual Art.

Popper documented the historical record of the relationship between technology and participatory forms of art, especially between the late 1960s and the early 1990s.

Kinetic Art and Op Art
In his books Origins and Development of Kinetic Art and Art, Action and Participation, Popper showed how Kinetic Art played an important part in pioneering the unambiguous use of optical movement and in fashioning links between science, technology, art and the environment. Popper was a champion of the humanizing effects of such an interdisciplinary synthesis.

Key to his initial thinking and activities as an aesthetician, cultural theorist, curator, teacher and art critic was his encounter in the early 1950s with the kinetic artist (and author of the book Constructivism) George Rickey. He subsequently encountered the artists Nicolas Schoffer and Frank Malina, whose works were based on first or second-hand scientific knowledge. Also Op Art in the early 1960s had a powerful effect on him. Indeed, Op proved to be a strong predecessor to what he was calling Virtual Art in that Op Art called attention to the spectator's individual, constructive, and changing perceptions - and thus called upon the spectator to transfer the creative act increasingly upon him or herself. Op beckons forth a consideration of the enlargement of the audience's participatory role; both in regard to the perception of meaning and actual physical changes to the work of art. Popper also had many personal encounters in Paris with Groupe de Recherche d’Art Visual, Carlos Cruz-Diez, Yaacov Agam, Jesus-Rafael Soto and Victor Vasarely, which proved to have had a substantial impact on his view of art and art history.

Virtual art
Following this inclination Popper took interest in the works of Piotr Kowalski, Roy Ascott and many others working with the early concept of networking. These artists confirmed his interest in spectator participation, which brought him to the late 1980s and the 1990s when immersive virtual reality and digital art began to become established. Popper began to investigate a range of works emerging in this era, including those of Shawn Brixey, Ebon Fisher, and Joseph Nechvatal. To explain and illustrate the emergence of a techno-aesthetic Popper stressed the panoramic and multi-generational reach of virtual art. As regards to virtual art, openness is stressed both from the point of view of the artists and their creativity and from that of the follow-up users in their reciprocating thoughts and actions. This commitment to the teeming openness found in virtual art can be traced to the theories of Umberto Eco and other aestheticians.  During his late career Eco expressed a consideration of the computer as a spiritual tool.

Popper used the term, virtual art, in reference to all the art made with the technical media developed at the end of the 1980s (or a bit before, in some cases). These include human-machine interfaces such as visualization casks, stereoscopic spectacles and screens, generators of three-dimensional sound, data gloves, data clothes, position sensors, tactile and power feed-back systems, etc. All these technologies allowed immersion into the image and interaction with it. The impression of reality felt under these conditions was not only provided by vision and hearing, but also by the other bodily senses. This multiple sensing was so intensely experienced at times, that Popper could speak of it as an immersive virtual reality (VR).

In his 2006 book From Technological to Virtual Art, Popper traced the development of immersive, interactive new media art from its historical antecedents through digital art, computer art, cybernetic art, multimedia and net art. Popper showed that contemporary virtual art is a further refinement of the technological art of the late twentieth century - and also a departure from it. What is new about this new media art, he argued, is its humanization of technology, its emphasis on interactivity, its philosophical investigation of the real and the virtual, and its multisensory nature. He argued further that what distinguishes the artists who practice virtual art from traditional artists is their combined commitment to aesthetics and technology. Their "extra-artistic" goals - linked to their aesthetic intentions - concern not only science and society but also basic human needs and drives.

Definition
Defining virtual art broadly as art that allows us, through an interface with technology, to immerse ourselves in computer art and interact with it, Popper identified an aesthetic-technological logic of creation that allows artistic expression through integration with technology. After describing artistic forerunners of virtual art from 1918 to 1983 - including art that used light, movement, and electronics - Popper looked at contemporary new media art forms and artists. He surveyed works that are digital based but materialized, multimedia offline works, interactive digital installations, and multimedia online works (net art) by many artists.<ref>Origins of Virtualism: An Interview with Frank Popper conducted by Joseph Nechvatal", CAA Art Journal, Spring 2004, pp. 62-77</ref>

Virtual art, he argued, offers a new model for thinking about humanist values in a technological age. Virtual art, as Popper saw it, is more than just an injection of the usual aesthetic material into a new medium, but a deep investigation into the ontological, psychological and ecological significance of such technologies. The aesthetic-technological relationship produces an unprecedented artform.

Sharing Popper's focus on art and technology are Jack Burnham (Beyond Modern Sculpture 1968) and Gene Youngblood (Expanded Cinema 1970). They show how art has become, in Popper's terms, virtualized.

Bibliography
 Origins and Development of Kinetic Art, New York Graphic Society/Studio Vista, 1968
 Kinetics, Arts Council of Great Britain, 1970
 Art—Action and Participation, New York University Press, 1975
  Die kinetische Kunst: Licht und Bewegung, Umweltkunst und Aktion, DuMont Schauberg, 1975 
  Le déclin de l'objet, Le Chêne, 1975
  Art, action et participation: L'artiste et la creativité aujourd'hui, Klincksieck, 1980
  Arte, Acción Y Participación: El Artista Y La Creatividad De Hoy, Akal Ediciones, 1989
 Agam, Harry N. Abrams, 1990
 Art of the Electronic Age, Thames & Hudson, 1997
  Reflexions sur l'exil, l'art et l'Europe: Entretiens avec Aline Dallier, Klincksieck, 1998
 From Technological to Virtual Art, Leonardo Books, MIT Press, 2006
  Écrire sur l'art : De l'art optique a l'art virtuel, L'Harmattan, 2007
 Yvaral (with Britta Vetter & Emma Healey), Robert Sandelson Ltd., 2007

Footnotes

References
 Roy Ascott, Behaviourist Art and the Cybernetic Vision, in Cybernetica, Vol. IX, No. 4, 1966; Vol. X, No. 1, 1967: 29.
  Naissance de l'art cinétique, Gauthier-Villars, Paris, 1967
 Origins and Development of Kinetic Art, Studio Vista and New York Graphic Society, 1968
  L'Arte cinetica, Einaudi, Turin, 1970
  Die Kinetische Kunst-Licht und Bewegung, Umweltkunst und Aktion, Dumont Schauberg, 1975
  Le déclin de l'objet, Le Chêne, 1975
 Art, Action and Participation, Studio Vista and New York University Press, 1975
 Yaacov Agam, monographie, Abrams, New York, 1976
  Art, action et participation : l'artiste et la créativité aujourd'hui, Klincksieck, 1980
  Kunst zwischen Natur und Technologie. Ein Gespräch mit Frank Popper, Jürgen Claus, Treffpunkt Kunst. Keil Verlag Bonn, 1982, pp. 19–22
  Künstler und sozialer Wandel, Gespräch mit Frank Popper, Jürgen Claus, ChippppKunst, Ullstein Materialien, Frankfurt am Main/Berlin, Bd. 35232, 1985, pp. 116–120
  Réflexions sur l'exil, l'art et l'Europe : Entretiens avec Aline Dallier, Klincksieck, 1998
 Origins of Virtualism: An Interview with Frank Popper conducted by Joseph Nechvatal, CAA Art Journal, Spring 2004, pp. 62–77
 Joseph Nechvatal, Frank Popper and Virtualised Art, Tema Celeste Magazine: Winter 2004 issue #101, pp. 48–53
 Charlie Gere, Art, Time and Technology: Histories of the Disappearing Body, Berg, 2005, p. 146
 Margaret Boden, Mind As Machine, Oxford University Press, 2006, p. 1089
  Lieser, Wolf. Digital Art. Langenscheidt: h.f. ullmann, 2009, p. 283
 Kristine Stiles & Peter Selz, Theories and Documents of Contemporary Art: A Sourcebook of Artists' Writings (Second Edition, Revised and Expanded by Kristine Stiles) University of California Press 2012, p. 450
  Jürgen Claus, "Frank Popper", in: "Liebe die Kunst. Eine Autobiografie in einundzwanzig Begegnungen", Kerber/ZKM, 2013, pp. 178–186, 
 Christiane Paul, Digital Art'', Thames & Hudson Ltd., 2015, p. 219

External links 
 
  Centre d'Art Contemporain Frank Popper, Marcigny, France
 From Technological to Virtual Art book by Frank Popper
 Frank Popper interviewed by Joseph Nechvatal

1918 births
2020 deaths
French centenarians
French art historians
Cultural historians
French art critics
Postmodern theory
Postmodernists
French art curators
French male writers
Men centenarians
People from Prague
Academic staff of Paris 8 University Vincennes-Saint-Denis
Czechoslovak emigrants to France